The 2018–19 Scottish Championship (known as the Ladbrokes Championship for sponsorship reasons) was the 24th season in the current format of 10 teams in the second tier of Scottish football. The fixtures were published on 15 June 2018, with the league starting on 4 August 2018.

Ten teams contested the league: Alloa Athletic, Ayr United, Dundee United, Dunfermline Athletic, Falkirk, Greenock Morton, Inverness CT, Partick Thistle, Queen of the South and Ross County.

Ross County won the league following a 4–0 win over Queen of the South on 26 April 2019 to return to the Premiership after only one season's absence.

Teams
The following teams have changed division since the 2017–18 season:

To Championship

Ayr United secured promotion to the Championship on 28 April 2018 after a 2–0 victory over Albion Rovers. Ross County were relegated to the Championship on 12 May 2018 after a 1–1 draw with St Johnstone. Alloa Athletic won promotion following a 2–1 aggregate victory in the play-off final. Partick Thistle were also relegated to the Championship following a 3–1 aggregate defeat to Livingston in the play-off final.

From Championship

Brechin City were relegated to League One on 24 March 2018 after a 2–0 defeat to Greenock Morton. St Mirren secured promotion to the Premiership on 14 April 2018 after a goalless draw with Livingston, who were also promoted after winning the Premiership play-off final. Dumbarton were relegated after losing the Championship play-off final.

Stadia and locations

Personnel and kits

Managerial changes

League summary

League table

Positions by round
The table lists the positions of teams after each week of matches. In order to preserve chronological progress, any postponed matches are not included in the round at which they were originally scheduled, but added to the full round they were played immediately afterwards. For example, if a match is scheduled for matchday 13, but then postponed and played between days 16 and 17, it will be added to the standings for day 16.

Source: BBC Sport 
Updated: 4 May 2019

Results
Teams play each other four times, twice in the first half of the season (home and away) and twice in the second half of the season (home and away), making a total of 180 games, with each team playing 36.

First half of season (Matches 1-18)

Second half of season (Matches 19-36)

Season statistics

Scoring

Top scorers

Hat-tricks

Note

4  Player scored four goals; (H) = Home, (A) = Away

Attendances

Awards

Monthly awards

Championship play-offs
The second bottom team (Queen of the South) entered into a 4-team playoff with the 2nd-4th placed teams in 2018–19 Scottish League One (Forfar Athletic, Raith Rovers and Montrose). Queen of the South secured their place in the Championship after defeating Raith 3–1 on aggregate in the final.

Semi-final

First leg

Second leg

Final

First leg

Second leg

References

Scottish Championship seasons
2
2
Scot